Christmas is a Christmas album by American country music singer Clay Walker. It was released September 10, 2002, on Warner Bros. Records. It features Walker's renditions of various Christmas songs. "Blue Christmas" and "Feliz Navidad" both charted on the Hot Country Songs charts from Christmas airplay.

Background
Walker told Country France, "The Christmas album we just made should be coming out right now. The thing I like about it so much is all of the songs are standards. No written, new material. I would rather personally sing along to a standard myself. So I just put myself in other people’s place. The thing I like the most about it is that it has orchestra, strings, horns, real orchestra, its costs a lot of money to make."

Track listing

Personnel

 David Angell – violin
 Monisa Angell – violin
 Janet Askey – violin
 Sam Bacco – chimes, cymbals, marimba, orchestra bells, percussion, sleigh bells, timpani, xylophone
 Eddie Bayers – drums, percussion
 Mike Bradley – engineer, mixing
 Mark Capps – production assistant
 Mark Casstevens – acoustic guitar
 Lisa Cochran – choir
 Ernie Collins – bass trombone
 Travis Cottrell – choir, background vocals
 Jackie Cusic – choir
 David Davidson – violin
 Tim Davis – choir
 Mark Douthit – saxophone
 Connie Ellisor – violin
 Jane Escueta – violin
 Christopher Farrell – viola
 Kim Fleming – choir, background vocals
 Steve Gibson – acoustic guitar, electric guitar
 Carl Gorodetzky – concert master, violin
 Allen Green – children's voices
 Barry Green – trombone
 Jim Grosjean – viola
 Marshall Hall – choir, background vocals
 Stephanie Hall – choir
 Vicki Hampton – choir, background vocals
 Mike Haynes – flugelhorn, trumpet
 Aubrey Haynie – fiddle
 David Hoffner – keyboards, programming
 Jim Horn – baritone saxophone
 David Hungate – bass guitar
 Mark Ivey – choir, background vocals
 Jack Jezzro – bass guitar
 Marabeth Jordan – choir
 Danny Kee – production assistant
 Lee Larrison – violin
 Chris McDonald – trombone
 Anthony LaMarchina – cello
 Joey Miskulin – accordion
 Doug Moffitt – piccolo, saxophone
 Cate Myer – violin
 The Nashville String Machine – strings
 Steve Nathan – keyboards, piano
 Craig Nelson – bass
 Jim Ed Norman – producer
 Gary Van Osdale – viola
 Mary Kathryn Van Osdale – violin
 Steve Patrick – trumpet
 Linda Patterson – french horn
 Carole Rabinwitz-Neuen – cello
 Gary Robinson – choir
 Lisa Silver – choir
 Oliver Silver – children's voices
 Pamela Sixfin – violin
 Betty Small – violin
 Dennis Solee – clarinet
 Liz Stewart – bass
 Julie Tanner – cello
 Joe Tassi – production assistant
 Bobby G. Taylor – french horn, oboe
 Simon Taylor – children's voices
 George Tidwell – trumpet
 Alan Umstead – viola
 Catherine Umstead – violin
 Cindy Richardson Walker – choir
 Clay Walker – lead vocals
 Bergen White – string arrangements, string conductor
 Kris Wilkinson – viola
 Hank Williams – mastering
 Dennis Wilson – choir
 Karen Winkelmann – violin
 Clare Yang – viola

Critical reception

Editors at The Cincinnati Post wrote "You might not be able to pick Clay Walker out of a lineup of second-tier country singers, but don't overlook this CD. Producer Jim Ed Norman paid careful attention to instrumentation, expertly meshing oboe, harp and everything else at his disposal with Walker's toned-down twang. Highlights include a heartfelt "Mary Did You Know" and a spirited "Go Tell It on the Mountain" with hand- clapping gospel choir and funky organ." Editors at USA Today wrote, "Walker sounds like a cowboy on some tracks, a crooner on others -- and he also displays rarely heard R&B and Mexican influences." The Denver Post printed, "Simple, straightforward takes on 'Rudolph the Red-Nosed Reindeer, 'Please Come Home for Christmas,' and 'Frosty the Snowman' stand out on a CD that also contains good versions of 'Go Tell It on the Mountain,' 'Mary Did You Know' and 'O Come All Ye Faithful.' Walker ends it with a bang- up, toe-tapping version of 'Feliz Navidad.'"

Bobby Reed of The Chicago Sun Times gave the album 2 and a half stars out of five and wrote, "Clay Walker is an odd candidate for recording a Christmas album, given his vocal limitations. There are some inspired moments in this straightforward collection, including a mid-song recitation in "Mary Did You Know" and the bright brass riffs that enliven "Feliz Navidad." Throughout the disc, however, the harmony singers fail to seamlessly mesh with Walker's lead vocals." Editors at About.com gave the album a favorable review writing "If you're a Clay Walker fan, you'll want to pick this up. If you're looking for traditional Christmas music, you'll find it here. Not much out of the ordinary here, but an adequate album." Brian Wahlert of Country Standard Time gave the album a positive review and said, "Although he doesn't always succeed here, the highlights are gratifying, and Walker should be applauded for taking a risk."

Chart performance

Weekly charts

References

Clay Walker albums
Warner Records albums
2002 Christmas albums
Albums produced by Jim Ed Norman
Christmas albums by American artists
Country Christmas albums